S. Abdallah S. Schleifer (born Marc Schleifer; 1935) is a prominent Middle East expert; a senior fellow at the Foreign Policy Research Institute (United States) and at the Royal Aal al-Bayt Institute for Islamic Thought (Jordan).

Career 
A former NBC Cairo Bureau chief (1974 - 1983), Schleifer also served as the Al Arabiya News bureau chief in Washington D.C. (2006 - 2007) and currently writes periodic columns for their website. He is the chief editor of the annual publication The 500 Most Influential Muslims.

His career in journalism in the Middle East began in 1965, when he served as the first managing editor of The Jerusalem Star, an English-language Jordanian newspaper that has since changed its name to The Palestine News. In 1967, Schleifer became an editorial assistant and then a special correspondent for The New York Times in Jerusalem and then in Amman, and, from 1968-1972, the Middle East correspondent of Jeune Afrique.

He is professor emeritus and senior fellow at the Kamal Adham Center for Journalism Training and Research, at the American University in Cairo - which he founded, and for which he served as its first director (1985 - 2005).

Schleifer was executive producer of Control Room (2004),  a documentary film about Al Jazeera and its relations with the US Central Command.

During his career, he has interviewed many Middle Eastern leaders—heads of state as well as Ayman al-Zawahiri the leader of Al-Qaeda since 2011.

Born Mark Schleifer to a secular Jewish family on Long Island, he received his BA in Political Science  from the University of Pennsylvania in 1956  where he was involved in Marxist movements. He is a convert to Islam with Sufi-orientation.

References 

1935 births
Living people
20th-century American Jews
American Muslims
American University of Beirut alumni
Converts to Islam from Judaism
People from Brooklyn
University of Pennsylvania alumni
People from Long Island